William Levett may refer to:

 William Levett (courtier), long-serving courtier to King Charles I of England
 William Levett (baron) (1200–1270), lord of the manor of the South Yorkshire village of Hooton Levitt
 William Levett (rector of Buxted) (c. 1495–1554), English clergyman
 William Levett (dean of Bristol) (died 1694), Oxford-educated personal chaplain to Edward Hyde, 1st Earl of Clarendon

See also
William Levitt, American real estate developer